Holit (lit. Dune) is a kibbutz in the Hevel Shalom region of south-west Israel. Located near Nir Yitzhak, the kibbutz is under the jurisdiction of Eshkol Regional Council.

History
The kibbutz was established in 1978 as a Nahal settlement near Yamit, in the Sinai Peninsula. However, as a result of the Israel-Egypt Peace Treaty in 1979, Israel was required to evacuate all its settlements in the peninsula.

In 1982 the kibbutz was re-established in its current location.

Production
Holit has three main types of income the cow ranch, factory and fields. The factory produces juicers, about 50 a week. Oranges, lemons, potatoes, mangos, nuts and carrots are all grown in the fields.

References

External links
Holit Negev Information Centre

Kibbutzim
Kibbutz Movement
Eshkol Regional Council
Populated places established in 1978
Populated places established in 1982
Nahal settlements
Former Israeli settlements in Sinai
Gaza envelope
Populated places in Southern District (Israel)
1978 establishments in the Israeli Military Governorate
1982 disestablishments in the Israeli Military Governorate
1982 establishments in Israel